Craugastor is a large genus of frogs in the family Craugastoridae with 126 species.

Species
The following species are recognised in the genus Craugastor:

References 

 
Craugastoridae
Amphibians of South America
Amphibians of Central America
Amphibians of North America
Amphibian genera
Taxa named by Edward Drinker Cope
Taxonomy articles created by Polbot